Jugari Cross is a novel by  Poornachandra Tejaswi,  a writer from Kannada whose works include novels, short stories, non-fiction and poetry. Jugari Cross is a suspense thriller which happens around common incidents that occur in an ordinary farming couple's life. The story takes place in a 24 hour period, with a trace of history and a literary quest, but seriously provokes the reader to analyze the wider spectrum of philosophy, literature, and the principles of the global economy's impacts on the normal people.

Characters
Suresha, Gouri, Sheshappa, Kutti, Rajappa, Doulath Rama, Kunta Rama, Jeevanlal, Dyawamma, Shastri

References

Kannada novels